The James A. Rawley Prize may refer to:

 James A. Rawley Prize (AHA), a history prize awarded by the American Historical Association (AHA) for the best book in Atlantic history
 James A. Rawley Prize (OAH), a history prize awarded by the  Organization of American Historians (OAH) for the best book on race relations in the United States